The Holden Woodville Plant was a manufacturing facility owned by the Australian motor vehicle manufacturer Holden situated in Cheltenham, South Australia, a suburb of Adelaide.

Etymology 
Although the plant is named after the Australian town of Woodville, South Australia, the actual plant was located in the adjacent suburb of Cheltenham.

History 

The Woodville plant got its first orders from General Motors. When Holden became the exclusive supplier of car bodies for General Motors, all of them were manufactured at the Woodville plant, from around 1949. The very first Holden car was completed and delivered from the Woodville plant in 1948.

The plant grew and developed largely under the guidance and vision of the Australian motor engineer Sir Laurence Hartnett, who was instrumental in the success of the Australian automobile industry. It was largely due to Hartnett that Holden went from a minor Australian marque to a significant competitor in the global car market.

Between 1959 and 1965, all non-obsolete equipment was moved to Holden's new Elizabeth plant. However Woodville continued to produced replacement parts for discontinued models. The Holden TriMatic transmission was produced at the plant until 1987, although the site was sold off in 1984. Through the 1980s, Holden progressively moved its operations to its Elizabeth plant, leading to the closure of Holden Woodville Plant.

The plant was finally demolished in 1991.

Achievements 
During the 1950s, the Woodville plant assembled approximately 10 per cent of all Holden vehicles assembled in Australia.

Although the Woodville plant was closed along with several other plants such as the Elizabeth manufacturing plant, the plant has lived on in the folklore of Australian industry veterans and in their collective memory.

See also 

 List of General Motors factories
 List of former automotive manufacturing plants

References

Further reading
 (Whole journal here)

External links 
 Woodville plant, South Australia • Mixed material • State Library of South Australia
 [Photographs of the Woodville plant prior to World War II] • Photograph • State Library of South Australia
 Woodville Holden plant

General Motors factories
Former motor vehicle assembly plants
Motor vehicle assembly plants in Australia
Vehicle manufacturing companies established  in 1947
Vehicle manufacturing companies disestablished  in 1992
Buildings and structures demolished in 1991
Demolished buildings and structures in South Australia